José Luis Mollaghan (born 2 May 1946) is an Argentinian prelate of the Roman Catholic Church. Since 2014 he has been an official of the Congregation for the Doctrine of the Faith. He previously held positions in Argentina, including Auxiliary Bishop of Buenos Aires and Archbishop of Rosario.

Mollaghan was born in Buenos Aires, Argentina. After the seminary he studied philosophy and theology at the Seminary of the Immaculate Conception of the Archdiocese of Buenos Aires.

In 1967 he obtained his licentiate in theology and a degree in canon law at the Pontifical Gregorian University in Rome. There he was ordained a priest by Bishop Jacques-Paul Martin on March 19, 1971. He then fulfilled pastoral assignments in Buenos Aires for several years and in 1975 began teaching on law at the Pontifical Catholic University of Argentina.

On 22 July 1993, Pope John Paul II appointed him Auxiliary Bishop of Buenos Aires with the titular see of Theuzi. He was consecrated a bishop on 2 October by Cardinal Antonio Quarracino. He held several post in the administration of the archdiocese including vicar for the administration and moderator of the curia. He served on several committees of the Argentine Episcopal Conference, becoming a member of its Executive Committee and Standing Committee and one of its delegates to the Latin American Bishops' Council. From 1994 to 1999 he was secretary general of the Bishops' Conference. Several years of his time as auxiliary in Buenos Aires coincided with the period when the Archbishop of Buenos Aires was Jorge Bergoglio, later Pope Francis.

Pope John Paul II named him Bishop of San Miguel on 17 May 2000. On 22 December 2005, Pope Benedict XVI appointed him Archbishop of Rosario, where he was installed on 18 March 2006.

On 19 May 2014, Pope Francis assigned Mollaghan to the Congregation for the Doctrine of the Faith in Rome to work on a commission responsible for handling cases of clerical pedophilia. Because the commission had not been established, he moved to Buenos Aires to signify his release from responsibility for the Rosario diocese. He told a congregation at a festive celebration in Rosario in August: "The technical director decides the changes. I just wanted to stay in Rosario, but he sent me to Buenos Aires to make work easy for me." He remained in Argentina, living in Buenos Aires for several months, before moving to Rome. The seven-member Commission was established on 11 November 2014 with responsibility for sexual abuse of minors, heresy, apostasy, misuse of the sacrament of penance, and the ordination of women. Argentine newspapers interpreted Mollaghan's assignment in Rome as an "elegant" way to remove him from Rosario following an investigation into the mismanagement of church funds and referred to Mollaghan as "an old rival" of the pope. Mollaghan denied that he represented a more conservative faction of the Argentine hierarchy and pointed to his long service alongside Bergoglio in Buenos Aires.

References

External links

21st-century Roman Catholic archbishops in Argentina
People from Buenos Aires
1946 births
Living people
Roman Catholic bishops of San Miguel (Argentina)
Roman Catholic archbishops of Rosario